Right Here and Now is the eighth studio album released by Australian musician Marcia Hines, in October 1994. It debuted and peaked at #21 on the ARIA chart. It is her first album of original songs since Love Sides in 1983.

Background
In March 1994, Hines toured nationally for the first time in seven years and she signed a new contract with Warner Music Australia.

Track listing

Charts
Right Here and Now debuted and peaked at number 21 in October 1994.

References

1994 albums
Warner Records albums
Marcia Hines albums